Tranopelta is a Neotropical genus of ants in the subfamily Myrmicinae.

Distribution
The genus is restricted to the Neotropical region, where the ants nest in soil or in the leaf litter. Tranopelta gilva is known from Costa Rica to Brazil, Tranopelta subterranea is found in Ecuador, Bolivia and Brazil.

Species
Tranopelta gilva  (synonyms Tranopelta amblyops  Tranopelta heyeri )
 Tranopelta subterranea

References

External links

Myrmicinae
Ant genera
Hymenoptera of South America
Hymenoptera of North America